The 2020 Georgia Democratic presidential primary was held on June 9, 2020 alongside the West Virginia primary, as part of the Democratic Party primaries for the 2020 presidential election. It was originally scheduled for March 24, 2020, but was moved to June 9 due to the COVID-19 pandemic, and previously cast early mail-in votes were disallowed and separately counted. The election coincided with primaries for Georgia's Class 2 Senate seat and Georgia's U.S. House of Representatives seats. The Georgia primary was an open primary, which awarded 118 delegates to the 2020 Democratic National Convention, of whom 105 were pledged delegates allocated on the basis of the primary results.

Former vice president and recently determined presumptive nominee Joe Biden won the primary and all 105 delegates with roughly 85% of the vote, while senator Bernie Sanders only received little more than 9%. Ten other withdrawn candidates, notably senator Elizabeth Warren in third place, made up the remaining 6%. When totalling from the participation in the March 24 and June 9 primaries, this primary theoretically resulted in the highest Democratic presidential primary turnout ever.

Procedure
Georgia was previously scheduled to be the only state voting on March 24, 2020, in the Democratic primaries, after secretary of state Brad Raffensperger had announced the date of the primary on June 19, 2019. The move marked a departure from past years, shifting away from an earlier March contest on Super Tuesday (traditionally made up of many southern states and therefore dubbed the "SEC primary"). Although its later date had the potential to diminish its influence, the Georgia primary's separation from other states on the primary calendar might also have placed it in a more influential position should the primary still have been competitive by then. Due to the COVID-19 pandemic, however, the primary was first on March 14 moved by Raffensberger to the general Georgia primary date for other offices on May 19, and then both primaries were on April 9 again rescheduled to June 9, with Georgia voting alongside equally rescheduled West Virginia on that day. More than 200,000 votes had already been cast by mail in the March 24 primary before it was cancelled. These votes were not included in the official June 9 primary result, however they were separately counted. Voters who participated in the March 24 primary were able to vote again in the June 9 primary, but only for other offices.

Voting was expected to take place throughout the state from 7:00 a.m. until 7:00 p.m. In the open primary, candidates had to meet a threshold of 15 percent at the congressional district or statewide level in order to be considered viable. The 105 pledged delegates to the 2020 Democratic National Convention were allocated proportionally on the basis of the results of the primary. Of these, between 3 and 7 were allocated to each of the state's 14 congressional districts and another 14 were allocated to party leaders and elected officials (PLEO delegates), in addition to 23 at-large delegates. Due to the original March date the primary as part of Stage I on the primary timetable received no bonus delegates, in order to disperse the primaries between more different date clusters and keep too many states from hoarding on a March date.

District-level delegates were elected on May 23 (caucuses to be held online, previously scheduled for March 28 or March 29) and then selected the 14 pledged PLEO delegates also online on June 20 (previously scheduled for April 18). The state committee meeting was subsequently held also on June 20 and voted on the 23 at-large delegates for the Democratic National Convention. The delegation also included 13 unpledged PLEO delegates: 8 members of the Democratic National Committee, 4 representatives from Congress, and former president Jimmy Carter.

Candidates 
The following candidates qualified for the ballot in Georgia:

Running

Joe Biden

Withdrawn

Michael Bennet
Michael Bloomberg
Pete Buttigieg
John Delaney
Tulsi Gabbard
Amy Klobuchar
Deval Patrick
Bernie Sanders
Tom Steyer
Elizabeth Warren
Andrew Yang

Polling

Results

See also
2020 Georgia Republican presidential primary

Notes

References

External links
The Green Papers delegate allocation summary
Georgia Democratic Party delegate selection plan 

Georgia Democratic
Democratic primary
2020
Georgia Democratic primary, 2020